Uruguaytherium is an extinct genus of astrapotherid mammal from the Late Oligocene to Early Miocene of South America. It was named by the Argentinean paleontologist Lucas Kraglievich in 1928, from a fragmentary fossil found in the Fray Bentos Formation of the department of Río Negro in Uruguay, and the type species is U. beaulieui. The related genera Xenastrapotherium and Granastrapotherium, which make up Uruguaytheriinae with Uruguaytherium, are also from South America, although them colonizated the equatorial zone. The holotype specimen of Uruguaytherium is a partial mandible (the left mandibular ramus), with a preserved third molar, or M3.

Phylogeny 
Cladogram based in the phylogenetic analysis published by Vallejo-Pareja et al., 2015, showing the position of Uruguaytherium:

References

Further reading 
 L. Kraglievich, 1928. "Sobre el supuesto Astrapotherium Christi Stehlin descubierto en Venezuela (Xenastrapotherium n. gen.) y sus relaciones con Astrapotherium magnum y Uruguaytherium beaulieui". p. 1-16

Meridiungulata
Prehistoric placental genera
Oligocene mammals of South America
Deseadan
Oligocene Uruguay
Miocene Uruguay
Fossils of Uruguay
Fossil taxa described in 1928